Esher is a town in Surrey, England, to the east of the River Mole.

Esher is an outlying suburb of London near the London-Surrey Border, and with Esher Commons at its southern end, the town marks one limit of the Greater London Built-Up Area. Esher has a linear commercial high street and is otherwise suburban in density, with varying elevations, few high rise buildings and very short sections of dual carriageway within the ward itself. Esher covers a large area, between 13 and 15.4 miles southwest of Charing Cross. In the south it is bounded by the A3 Portsmouth Road which is of urban motorway standard and buffered by the Esher Commons.

Esher is bisected by the A307, historically the Portsmouth Road, which for approximately  forms its high street. Esher railway station (served by the South West Main Line) connects the town to London Waterloo. Sandown Park Racecourse is in the town near the station.

In the south, Claremont Landscape Garden owned and managed by the National Trust, once belonged, as their British home, to Princess Charlotte and her husband Leopold I of Belgium. Accordingly, the town was selected to have a fountain by Queen Victoria and has an adjacent Diamond Jubilee column embossed with a relief of the monarch and topped by a statue of Britannia.  Unite, the union, trains representatives at its Esher Place centre, and the town has the offices of Elmbridge Borough Council in its high street.

History
Esher lay within the Saxon feudal division of Elmbridge hundred.

Esher appears in the Domesday Book of 1086 as Aissela and Aissele, where it is held partly by the Abbey of the Cross in Normandy; partly by William de Waterville; partly by Reginald; partly by Hugh do Port; and partly by Odard Balistarius (probably a crossbowman). It rendered £6 2s 0d per year to its feudal overlords.

In the 16th century King Henry VIII annexed several of the manors to the Honour of Hampton Court to form a royal hunting ground, and new residences were permitted by a number of wealthy courtesans. Esher's town slowly grew as a stagecoach stop on the London–Portsmouth road that was later numbered the A3, although it was bypassed in the mid-1970s when it became the A307.  Clive of India built the Claremont mansion and this later became a royal residence used by Queen Victoria. In 1841 Esher had 1261 inhabitants across . Queen Victoria lent Claremont to the exiled French King Louis-Philippe and his consort Queen Marie-Amelie after the revolution of 1848.  Prince Leopold of Saxe-Coburg lived there until he became King of the Belgians

By 1908, Esher contained the fashionable residences of several important figures including Lady Emma Talbot; Sir Robert Hawthorn Collins, the Duchess of Albany and Sir Edgar Vincent, K.C.M.G. who was later created 1st Viscount D'Abernon.

George Harrison of The Beatles had a house (called Kinfauns) in Esher, during the 1960s. The other Beatles were regular visitors to the house, and Harrison's primitive home recording studio.

Maurice Gibb of the Bee Gees also owned a house called The Firs in Esher, during 1970s–2004 and sold after his death. This is where the hit single "Juliet" was written and recorded by Maurice and Robin Gibb for brother Robin's solo album project in the 1980s.

Sir Arthur Conan Doyle placed the murder of fictional character, Mr. Garcia, in and around Esher in his Sherlock Holmes mystery, "The Adventure of Wisteria Lodge". In the mystery, Dr. Watson described his and Sherlock Holmes' arrival in Esher by stating, "It was nearly six c'clock before we found ourselves in the pretty Surrey village of Esher, with Inspector Baynes as our companion."

Government
Esher is within the Esher and Walton parliamentary constituency which has been represented by Dominic Raab, a member of the Conservative Party, since 2010. The predecessor Esher parliamentary constituency was replaced on boundary changes before the 1997 general election.

Esher is part of the East Molesey and Esher ward of Surrey County Council. The ward is represented by a Residents' association councillor.

The town is covered by the Esher ward of Elmbridge Borough Council, which has elections in three years out of four (is elected in thirds) represented by:

Education
Esher has a mix of state and private schools. There are four state primary schools across the area of Esher, Esher Church School, Cranmere, Hinchley Wood and Claygate. Esher Church of England High School is the state secondary school in the town of Esher. Hinchley Wood School in Hinchley Wood has been an Academy since February 2012. Hinchley Wood is also one of the Further education establishments in the area. Esher College is in nearby Thames Ditton.
Esher is also home to the West End Playgroup & Forest School, a pre-school for 2-5 year olds.

Economy
Esher has office buildings in the High Street and its continuation, Portsmouth Road, which has a cluster of entertainment and dining venues. Esher has a local (roughly county-level) farmers market held on one Saturday every month, moving forward one week each month. Vendors sell locally sourced produce and two riverside farms on the edge of town, one with large shop and grow-your-own are open to the public. A light smattering of small businesses, particularly in construction and landscaping pervades the town. A large hospice in Esher serves North Surrey, with field staff providing relief to cancer patients. Otherwise the town's residents do business or create products from home or elsewhere, such as in the M4 corridor and the City of London.

Culture, community and sport

Cinema
The Everyman (formerly Odeon) cinema is a central feature of Esher's High Street with four screens.

Sport
Esher Cricket Club was established in 1863. They play matches in the Esher Park private estate, in New Road and have a youth cricket training and playing squad.

The members of the cricket club also wanted to play tennis and established the Esher Lawn Tennis Club in 1889.

A second cricket club arrived in 1875 as West End (Esher) Cricket Club.

Esher has a history with horse racing since the purpose-built Sandown Park race course opened in 1875.

In 1881 Esher Leopold football club was established which was formed out of the ashes of the dissolved Weybridge Swallows club. The club played at Sandown Park, close to the racecourse. The club's sole contribution to the national game was its one appearance in the FA Cup, a 5–0 home defeat to the holders, Old Carthusians, in 1881–82, although the club did reach the semi-finals of the Surrey Senior Cup, losing to Reigate Priory. The club continued into the 1883–84 season.

Esher Rugby Club was established in 1923 and play on the Hersham borders at the Molesey Road stadium, where they have several training grounds there.

A smaller football club AFC Westend was established in 2003.

Amenities, local events and media
King George's Hall is multi-functional conferencing technology-equipped venue available for corporate or group hire, a non-for-profit community facility.

Moore Place, on the outskirts of Esher, bar and restaurant Esteem, featured as the restaurant in the 4th episode of the first series of Ramsay's Kitchen Nightmares. 

Esher West End hosts an annual flower show and the Hampton Court Flower Show is nearby. Similarly, Surrey Wildlife Trust manage Wisley and Ockham Commons, partly within the borough of Elmbridge and Esher is approximately midway between the two leading Surrey and International Gardens, the Royal Botanical Gardens, Kew and RHS Garden, Wisley.

A weekly newspaper, Esher News and Mail, closed down in 2009. Current newspapers include the Surrey Herald: Cobham, Esher and Claygate edition and Living Within monthly magazine/newspaper.

Elevations range from 10m to 47m above sea level. Vantage points – Esher's promontories – include various outcrops of Esher Commons close to Hersham, Cobham and Oxshott for free public use, Esher Place (national training centre of Unite, the union) where a grass garden amphitheatre was built by Lutyens for what was the manor house, the facilities at Sandown Park racecourse and Claremont Landscape Garden.

Housing

The average level of accommodation in the region composed of detached houses was 28%, the average that was apartments was 22.6%.

The proportion of households in the settlement who owned their home outright compares to the regional average of 35.1%. The proportion who owned their home with a loan compares to the regional average of 32.5%. The remaining % is made up of rented dwellings (plus a negligible % of households living rent-free).

Notable residents

 John Cobb (1899–1952), racing driver.
 Maurice Gibb (1949–2003), pop musician.
 George Harrison (1943–2001), musician.
 Sam Kelly (1943–2014), actor.
 Sophie Dora Spicer Maude (1854-?), writer
 Montague Phillips (1885-1969), composer, lived at Clare Cottage, Clare Hill for 50 years.
 Roger Scantlebury (1936–), computer scientist.
 Pattie Boyd (1944–), model and photographer.
 Eric Sykes (1923–2012), comedic actor and writer.
 Chris Tarrant (1946–), television light entertainment presenter.
 Lily James (1989–), actress.
 Roots Manuva (1972–), hip-hop musician.

In film, fiction and the media

The housing in Esher supports a view of its being presented in some parts of the media as a particularly middle class part of suburbia. Very few places with town status in England have an absolute majority of detached houses.

The sitcom On the Up starring Dennis Waterman was set in Esher.

See also 
St. George's Church, Esher
Wayneflete Tower
West End, Esher
Lower Green, Esher
William Brett, 1st Viscount Esher

Notes and references
Notes 
  
References

External links 

Towns in Surrey
Unparished areas in Surrey
Borough of Elmbridge